Fatjon Celani (born 14 January 1992) is a German professional footballer who plays as a striker for FC Memmingen.

External links

1992 births
Living people
Footballers from Munich
German people of Albanian descent
Association football forwards
Albanian footballers
SV Wacker Burghausen players
FC Augsburg players
VfR Mannheim players
TuS Koblenz players
TSG Neustrelitz players
TSV Steinbach Haiger players
FC Memmingen players
3. Liga players
Regionalliga players